Pope.L (also known as William Pope.L, born 1955 in Newark, New Jersey) is an American visual artist best known for his work in performance art, and interventionist public art. However, he has also produced art in painting, photography and theater. He was included in the 2002 Whitney Biennial and is a Guggenheim Fellow and a recipient of the Creative Capital Visual Arts Award. Pope.L was also included in the 2017 Whitney Biennial.

Education

Pope.L attended Pratt Institute from 1973 to 1975 and participated in the Whitney Museum of American Art Independent Study Program from 1977 to 1978. He received a Bachelor of Arts degree from Montclair State University, Montclair, New Jersey, in 1978. He received a Master of Fine Arts degree in visual arts from the Mason Gross School of the Arts at Rutgers University, New Brunswick, New Jersey in 1981.

Early work

From 1990 to 2010, Pope.L was a lecturer of Theater and Rhetoric at Bates College in Lewiston, Maine. As a faculty member he directed a production of Lorraine Hansberry's A Raisin In the Sun, in which he used both African-American and Caucasian actors as members of the same family.

For ATM Piece, performed in 1997, he attached himself with an eight-foot length of Italian sausage to the door of a Chase Bank in midtown Manhattan wearing nothing but timberland boots and a skirt made out of dollar bills.

eRacism, a project that Pope.L began during the late 1970s, included over 40 endurance-based performances consisting of “crawls”, varying in length and duration.  In one example titled Tompkins Square Crawl (1991) Pope.L dressed in a business suit and crawled through the gutter in Tompkins Square Park, New York, pushing a potted flower with one hand.  Another example titled The Great White Way involved a crawl which stretched over 22 miles and took five years to complete. For this performance he donned a Superman outfit and strapped a skateboard to his back. The crawl stretched the entire 22 miles of Broadway, in New York City.  Documentation of this performance was included in the 2002 Whitney Biennial.

2001 – 2010
In 2001 the National Endowment for the Arts (NEA) advisory renew panel granted Pope.L $42,000 in financing for a traveling retrospective called "William Pope.L: eRacism". Shortly after announcing the award, the acting chairman, Robert S. Martin, rescinded funding for the grant. Joel Wachs, then president of the Andy Warhol Foundation for Visual Arts, stated in the December 21 issue of The New York Times: "It is important, particularly in light of what I would consider an attack on freedom of expression, to stand firm.  We want this exhibition to occur; we want other funders to step forward; we don't want the N.E.A.'s decision to be something that has the effect of stopping what I think is going to be an important exhibition of art." 
The Warhol Foundation, in partnership with the Rockefeller Foundation and the LEF Foundation provided $50,000 in funding for the traveling retrospective to tour the United States.  eRacism exhibited at the Institute of Contemporary Art at Maine College of Art; Diverse Works Art space, Houston, 2003; Portland Institute for Contemporary Art (PICA), Oregon, 2003; and Artists Space, New York, 2003 .

The catalog "William Pope.L: Friendliest Black Artist in America" was produced by curator Mark Bessire in conjunction with the retrospective exhibition.

In 2002 Pope.L received a Foundation for Contemporary Arts Grants to Artists award. In 2004 he received a Guggenheim Fellowship. In 2005 The Black Factory, an art installation on wheels, traveled from Maine to Missouri as part of The Interventionists show organized by the Massachusetts Museum of Contemporary Art (Mass MOCA). "Typically the Factory arrives at a city or town and sets up its interactive workshop on the street. People bring objects that represent blackness to them. The Factory’s workers use these objects in tightly rehearsed but loosely performed skits to stimulate a conversation — a flow of ideas, images and experiences. Most objects are photographed and made part of the Factory’s virtual library, some are housed in the Factory’s archive for later use, and some are pulverized in the Factory’s workshop to make new products available in the Factory’s gift shop."

In 2006 he was selected as one of the United States Artists fellows, for which he was awarded a $50,000 unrestricted grant.

He was featured alongside other performing artists: Sean Penn, Willem Dafoe, Brad Pitt, Steve Buscemi, and Juliette Binoche in Robert Wilson's LAB HD portraits. In 2008, Pope.L's piece "One Substance, Eight Supports, One Situation" was selected to participate in The Renaissance Society's group exhibition, "Black Is, Black Ain't".

In 2010 Pope.L was appointed faculty at the University of Chicago.

Recent work
In 2015 MOCA, Los Angeles presented Trinket, the largest solo museum presentation of Pope.L's work to date. The centerpiece of the show is Trinket, a monumental, custom-made American flag (approximately 54 x 16 feet) hanging on a pole in the middle of the Geffen. During the museum's public hours the flag will be continuously blown by four large-scale industrial fans — the type used on Hollywood film sets to create wind or rain effects — and will be illuminated from below by a bank of custom theatrical lights. Over time the flag will appear to fray at its ends due to the constant whipping of the forced air, a potent metaphor for the rigors and complexities of democratic engagement and participation. Trinket was originally produced in 2008 at Grand Arts, in Kansas City, Mo., as the centerpiece of Pope.L's exhibition  Animal Nationalism.

In 2015 Pope.L 	produced The Beautiful, a new choreographed crawl performance staged for the first time at Art Basel in Miami Beach.  For The Beautiful, four men, dressed as Superman with skateboards strapped to their backs, roll onward in the dark. The rumbling of their wheels grows louder through speakers as they approach the crowd, and blends with the low churning of electric guitars. The ‘Super-Gents’ reach a wooden stage and crab-walk their way up, barely fitting onto the small surface. Holding each other, they finally break into a heart-rending, soulful version of the patriotic song America The Beautiful.

In fall 2019, a trio of exhibitions of his work, collectively titled “Instigation, Aspiration, Perspiration,” took place at Museum of Modern Art, The Whitney Museum, and the Public Art Fund. The first exhibition, "Conquest" was a communal performance piece with 140 participants who crawled on sidewalks for 1.5 mile relay style, over the course of five hours. The performance started in Greenwich Village and ending in Union Square in New York City. The exhibition at MoMA, "member: Pope.L, 1978-2001," included 13 early landmark performance from the artist. At the Whitney, he created a new piece of work titled "Choir." This room sized installation featured an industrial water tank with sound landscaping from contact microphones on the pipes in the room.

Pope. L  is included in the group show Black Melancholia. The exhibition curated by Nana Adusei-Poku includes 28 artists and focuses on the themes of grief and pain.

Quotes
Pope.L's art focuses on issues of consumption, social class, and masculinity as they relate to race. He is quoted as saying of his own work: “I am a fisherman of social absurdity, if you will…  My focus is to politicize disenfranchisement, to make it neut, to reinvent what’s beneath us, to remind us where we all come from.”

In his Foundation for Contemporary Art Fellowship bio, he writes: "Like the African shaman who chews his pepper seeds and spits seven times into the air, I believe art re-ritualizes the everyday to reveal something fresh about our lives. This revelation is a vitality and it is a power to change the world.".

Selected publications
 Pope.L: My Kingdom for a Title Los Angeles: New Documents. 2021. 
 member: Pope.L, 1978-2001. New York: The Museum of Modern Art. 2019. 
 William Pope.L: The Friendliest Black Artist in America Cambridge, MA: The MIT Press. 2002.

References

Further reading
 The Whole Entire World: Interview with William Pope.L by Amy Horschak in Dak'Art 2006, La Biennale de Dakar: Dakar, 2006, p. 382-383.
 Pope.L: Showing Up to Withhold, The Renaissance Society at the University of Chicago, The University of Chicago Press: Chicago, IL, 2014.

External links 
 The Black Factory project official website
 Documentary Film of the Black Factory Rehearsal 2005
 Artful Mind article from 2004
 The Void Show Exhibition Review published in X-TRA Contemporary Art Quarterly

1955 births
Living people
20th-century American painters
American male painters
21st-century American painters
21st-century American male artists
American performance artists
Bates College faculty
University of Chicago faculty
African-American contemporary artists
American contemporary artists
American contemporary painters
Drama teachers
Walking artists
Franklin Furnace artists
Skowhegan School of Painting and Sculpture alumni
20th-century African-American painters
21st-century African-American artists
20th-century American male artists
Artists from Newark, New Jersey
Painters from New Jersey